Walter Bouldin Dam is a dam in Elmore County, Alabama.  The closest town is Wetumpka.

The earthen dam was constructed in 1967 by the Alabama Power Company, with a height of 170 feet, and a length of 11,178 feet at its crest.  It impounds the Coosa River for 225 MW of hydroelectric power, the last and largest of Alabama Power's string of seven hydropower facilities on that river.  It's also the largest of all Alabama Power hydropower facilities.

It's an excellent recreational lake with fishing opportunities for largemouth bass, spotted bass, bluegill and other sunfish, crappie, catfish, striped bass, hybrid and white bass. The lake has two public access sites.

Walter Bouldin Dam failed on February 10, 1975 by breach, with no casualties and no property damage beyond the dam property itself.

References 

Energy infrastructure completed in 1967
Dams in Alabama
Reservoirs in Alabama
Alabama Power dams
Buildings and structures in Elmore County, Alabama
Hydroelectric power plants in Alabama